Captain Adrian James Boswell Tonks  (10 May 1898 – 14 July 1919) was a British First World War flying ace. He was officially credited with twelve aerial victories, and was twice awarded the Distinguished Flying Cross.

Early life and background
Tonks was born in Solihull, Warwickshire, the son of Arthur George Tonks, a mechanical engineer, and his wife Alice.

World War I
Tonks entered the Royal Naval Air Service as a probationary flight sub-lieutenant with seniority from 13 August 1916. He received Royal Aero Club Aviator's Certificate No. 4206 after soloing a Maurice Farman biplane at the Royal Naval Air Service Training Establishment Cranwell on 28 December 1916.
 
In August 1917 Tonks was posted to No. 4 (Naval) Squadron to fly the Sopwith Camel single-seat fighter, gaining his first aerial victories during his first combat mission on 22 August, when he sent down two German Albatros D.V fighters out of control south-east of Ostend. On 9 November, it was a DFW reconnaissance two-seater that he put down out of control north of Pervijze, Belgium. On 23 November 1917, he scored another "out of control" victory east of Keiem, over another Albatros D.V.

Tonks was promoted to flight lieutenant on 1 January 1918. On 1 April 1918, the Royal Naval Air Service was merged with the Army's Royal Flying Corps to form the Royal Air Force, and No. 4 (Naval) became No. 204 Squadron RAF, and Tonks became a lieutenant with the honorary rank of captain in the new service.

He resumed scoring on 30 June 1918, driving down a Fokker D.VII out of control over Zeebrugge. On 8 July he was appointed a temporary captain. On both 10 and 13 August, he drove down another Fokker D.VII, the latter being flown by Leutnant Dieter Collin, the Staffelführer of Jasta 56. On 15 August, he sent down three Fokker D.VIIs out of control east of Ypres. On 28 September 1918, he destroyed a Fokker D.VII over Werken, and sent another down out of control. He then turned to low-altitude ground attack missions. until October 1918 when he was rested from combat.

Tonks won two Distinguished Flying Crosses in quick succession. The first one, awarded on 2 November 1918, was granted for his valour in aerial combat. His citation read:

He received a Bar to the Distinguished Flying Cross in lieu of a second award on 3 December 1918. His citation read:

List of aerial victories

Post-war career
On 3 January 1919, Tonks was confirmed in his rank of captain. He was posted to No. 80 Squadron RAF in the Egyptian Expeditionary Force, based at RAF Aboukir, Alexandria, but on 13 July 1919 he crashed his Sopwith Pup at Cairo, and died from his injuries the following day. He is buried in plot B.158 in the Hadra War Memorial Cemetery in Alexandria.

References

1898 births
1919 deaths
People from Solihull
Royal Naval Air Service personnel of World War I
Royal Air Force personnel of World War I
British World War I flying aces
Recipients of the Distinguished Flying Cross (United Kingdom)
Aviators killed in aviation accidents or incidents
Victims of aviation accidents or incidents in Egypt
Victims of aviation accidents or incidents in 1919